Viru Keemia Grupp (VKG) is an Estonian holding group of oil shale industry, power generation, and public utility companies.

History

After Estonia gained independence, the state owned oil shale enterprise, Riigi Põlevkivitööstus, was established as a department of the Ministry for Trade and Industry on 24 November 1918. Shale oil production started in Estonia in 1921 when Riigi Põlevkivitööstus built 14 experimental oil shale processing retorts in Kohtla-Järve. These vertical retorts used the method developed by Julius Pintsch AG that would later evolve into the current Kiviter processing technology.  Along with the shale oil extraction plant, an oil shale research laboratory was founded in 1921.  Following the experimental retorts, the first commercial shale oil plant was put into operation on 24 December 1924. This is considered as a beginning of the history of Viru Keemia Grupp.

In October 1936, Riigi Põlevkivitööstus was reorganized as the government-owned joint stock company and was renamed Esimene Eesti Põlevkivitööstus.  It operated three shale oil extraction plants and was constructing the fourth plant. After occupation of Estonia by the Soviet Union, the company was subordinated to the Soviet authorities in December 1940. During the subsequent German occupation, the industry was merged into a company named Baltische Öl GmbH, subordinated to Kontinentale Öl.

During the following Soviet occupation, the company became the Kohtla-Järve shale oil combinate ( under the General Directorate of Synthetic Liquid Fuel and Gas of the USSR (Glavgaztopprom). In 1948, the company opened an oil shale gas plant, and for several decades the oil shale gas was used as a substitute for natural gas in Saint Petersburg (then known as Leningrad) and in northern Estonian cities. It was the first time in history that synthetic gas from oil shale was used in households.

In 1995, the Kohtla-Järve factory and factory in Kiviõli were merged into the single company named RAS Kiviter.  In 1997, Kiviter was privatized and a year later it declared insolvency. Its factory in Kohtla-Järve was acquired by newly established Viru Keemia Grupp.

In 2008, the company received a permit for developing the Boltysh oil shale deposit in Ukraine.

VKG Oil opened three new Galoter-type oil plants called Petroter correspondingly in December 2009, in October 2014, and in November 2015.

In January 2016, the company announced that due to low oil prices, it will close the old oil plants using Kiviter technology and lay off 500 workers.

Operations
VKG's two main areas of operations are shale oil extraction, and electricity and heat production and distribution.

Shale oil production

The subsidiary producing shale oil is VKG Oil. The company utilizes two different processes: Kiviter and Galoter. The company also tested but rejected the Alberta Taciuk Process. In total, VKG Oil processes 2 million tons of oil shale per year, producing 250,000 tons of shale oil.

The company operates several Kiviter retorts, the largest of them having a processing capacity of 40 tonnes per hour of oil shale feedstock. As of 2016, these retorts were out of operation due to low oil prices.  It also operates three Galoter-type retorts called Petroter. Engineering of the retort was done by Atomenergoproject of Saint Petersburg; engineering of the condensation and distillation plant was done by Rintekno of Finland.  The first Petroter plant has a processing capacity of 1.1 million tonnes of oil shale per year, and it produces 100,000 tonnes of shale oil,  of oil shale gas, and 150 GWh of steam per year.

Power generation and distribution

VKG's subsidiary VKG Energia, a power and heat generation company, was established in 2004 after VKG bought the Kohtla-Järve Power Plant and the Kohtla-Järve heat distribution system from Kohtla-Järve Soojus.  In 2005, it bought another power plant in Kohtla-Järve from Fortum Termest.  In 2006, VKG bought a 40.8% stake in Kohtla-Järve Soojus, an operator of the Ahtme Power Plant, and in 2010 it took a full control of the company, now VKG Soojus.  All generations capacities were transferred to VKG Energia while VKG Soojus is responsible for heat distribution.  All generations capacities were transferred to VKG Energia while VKG Soojus is responsible for heat distribution.  VKG Energia has installed electrical capacity of 80 MW and heat capacity of 700 MW.

In July 2006, VKG acquired Narva Elektrivõrk, the second-largest power distribution company in Estonia, and renamed it VKG Elektrivõrgud.

Other activities
In April 2011, VKG acquired assets of a bankrupt company Silbet Plokk that manufactured cinder blocks for construction from oil shale burning residue.  The company was renamed VKG Plokk.
The coalition-agreement of Jüri Ratas' second cabinet formed in 2019 between the Centre Party, EKRE and Pro Patria, expresses support to the development of the local oil industry.  Therefore, VKG and Eesti Energia decided to initiate a cost-benefit study aimed at establishing an oil pre-refining plant in Ida-Viru County. The plant would require a 650 million euro investment.

Subsidiaries

Main subsidiaries of VKG are:
VKG Oil - shale oil producer
Viru RMT – company producing, assembling and repairing metal structures, pipelines and pressure equipment
VKG Transport – transportation company
VKG Energia - heat and power generation company
VKG Soojus – heat distribution company
VKG Elektrivõrgud – electricity distribution company
VKG Elektriehitus – construction of power systems
VKG Kaevandused – oil shale mining
VKG Plokk – production of cinder blocks
OOO Slantsehim (73.4%) – developer of Boltysh oil shale deposit in Ukraine

See also

 Energy in Estonia

References

Bibliography

External links

 

Chemical companies of Estonia
Electric power companies of Estonia
Oil shale companies of Estonia
Synthetic fuel companies
Kohtla-Järve